Aslanbek Fidarov (4 May 1973 – 8 December 2020) was a Ukrainian wrestler. He competed in the men's freestyle 57 kg at the 1996 Summer Olympics. Fidarov died from COVID-19 during the pandemic in Russia.

References

External links
 

1973 births
2020 deaths
People from Vladikavkaz
Ukrainian male sport wrestlers
Olympic wrestlers of Ukraine
Wrestlers at the 1996 Summer Olympics
Place of birth missing
Deaths from the COVID-19 pandemic in Russia